Tor Edvin Dahl (born 10 September 1943) is a Norwegian novelist, crime fiction writer, playwright, children's writer, non-fiction writer, translator, literary critic and journalist. He made his literary debut in 1968 with the short story collection En sommer tung av regn. His first novel was Den andre from 1972, and his literary breakthrough was the novel Guds tjener from 1973. 

He has written crime fiction using the pseudonym "David Torjussen". His first crime novel, Etterforskning pågår from 1973, earned him the Riverton Prize. 

He was awarded the Gyldendal's Endowment in 1973.

References

1943 births
Living people
20th-century Norwegian novelists
Norwegian crime fiction writers
Norwegian dramatists and playwrights
Norwegian children's writers
Norwegian non-fiction writers
Norwegian translators
Norwegian literary critics
Writers from Oslo